During the course of the Battle of Mosul (2016–17), an international coalition, primarily composed of the Iraqi Army, Kurdish Peshmerga, CJTF–OIR, along with the allied Popular Mobilization Forces, Company A, 2-502 Infantry Regiment, 101st Airborne Division (Air Assault), captured Mosul from the Islamic State, which had used Mosul as the capital for the Iraqi half of its "caliphate".

Anti-IS forces 

Commanded by Iraqi Prime Minister Haider al-Abadi, Lieutenant General Abdul Amir Rashid Yarallah (commander of the operation), Major General Najim Abdullah al-Jubouri (ISF commander of the operation)
  Iraqi Army
  1st Division
 9th Armored DivisionCommanded by Lieutenant General Qassim Jassem Nazal
 15th Division
 16th Division
 3rd GroupCommanded by Colonel Mohamed Moheil Suleiman al-Jabouri
 Unknown
 91st BrigadeCommanded by Colonel Falah Hassan Salman
  Iraqi Air Force

  Iraqi Counter Terrorism Service (ICTS)Commanded by Lieutenant General Talib Shaghati al-Kenan (Joint Military Operation Command), Lieutenant General Abdul-Ghani al-Assadi, Lieutenant General Abdel-Wahab al-Saadi
  Iraqi Special Operations Forces (ISOF)
 1st Special Operations Brigade ("Golden Division")Commanded by Major General Fadhil Jalil al-Barwari
 1st Commando Battalion
 2nd Special Operations BrigadeCommanded by Major General Maan al-Saadi
  Federal PoliceCommanded by Lieutenant General Raed Shaker Jawdat
 Iraqi police rapid response unitsCommanded by Major General Thamer al-Husseini
  Assyrian forces
  Nineveh Plain Protection UnitsCommanded by General Behnam Abboosh
 Nineveh Plain ForcesCommanded by Safaa Khamro
 Dwekh NawshaCommanded by Albert Kisso
  Babylon Brigades Commanded by Rayan al-Kildani, a Chaldean Catholic Assyrian with close ties to the Badr Organization
 Popular Mobilization Forces (PMF)Commanded by Abu Mahdi al-Muhandis
  Badr OrganizationCommanded by Hadi Al-Amiri
  Asa'ib Ahl al-HaqCommanded by Qais al-Khazali
 Peace Companies
  Kata'ib Hezbollah
 Saraya Ashura
 Saraya Khorasani
 Kata'ib al-Imam Ali
 Harakat Hezbollah al-Nujaba
  Turkmen Brigades
 Saraya al-Jihad
 39th Regiment
 Sinjar Alliance
  Sinjar Resistance Units (YBŞ)Commanded by Mazlum Shengal
  Êzîdxan Women's Units (YJÊ)Commanded by Berivan Arin
 Local residents

Commanded by President Massoud Barzani
  Peshmerga

Combined Joint Task Force – Operation Inherent Resolve (CJTF–OIR)

Commanded by Lieutenant General Stephen J. Townsend
 Combined Joint Forces Land Component Command – Operation Inherent Resolve (CJFLCC-OIR)Commanded by Major General Joseph M. Martin

  U.S. Air Force
  U.S. Marine CorpsCommanded by Major General Gary J. Volesky
101st Airborne Division (Air Assault), 2nd Brigade Combat Team, 2-502 Infantry Regiment

  French Air Force
  French Army

 

 

Commanded by Secretary-General Sayyed Hassan Nasrallah
 Hezbollah military
 Hezbollah units in IraqCommanded by Muhammad Kawarithmi

 IRGC
 Basij

Islamic State 

Military of the Islamic State
 Wilayat Nineveh
 Al-Khansaa Brigade
 Australian Brigade
 Islamic Police (Al-Hisbah)
 Tariq Bin Ziyad battalion
Ramadi brigade (under Kawasir Division) 
Fallujah brigade (under Yamama Division)
 3 brigade from Furqan division
 Abu Umar al-Baghdadi brigade (under fatah division)
 Tikrit brigade (under Qadisiya division)

See also 
 Battle of Mosul (2016–17)
 Order of battle for the Raqqa campaign (2016–17)

References 

Order of battle
Orders of battle